The provinces of Kenya were replaced by a system of counties in 2010.

History 
Before the new constitution of Kenya that came into force on August 27, 2010, Kenya was divided into eight provinces (see map). The provinces, excluding Nairobi Province, were subdivided into 46 districts, which were further subdivided into 262 divisions. The divisions were subdivided into 2,427 locations and 6,612 sublocations. A province was administered by a Provincial Commissioner.

Kenyan local authorities generally do not follow common boundaries with divisions. They are classified as city, municipality, town or county councils.

A third discrete type of classification are electoral constituencies. They are electoral areas without administrative functions, and are further subdivided into wards.

Former provinces 
 Central
 Coast
 Eastern
 Nairobi
 North Eastern
 Nyanza
 Rift Valley
 Western

Counties by former province

See also 
ISO 3166-2:KE
List of provinces of Kenya by Human Development Index

References 

 
Former subdivisions of Kenya
Kenya geography-related lists
2013 disestablishments in Kenya
States and territories disestablished in 2013